Daniel Henry Arndt (born March 26, 1955 in Saskatoon, Saskatchewan) is a former professional ice hockey left winger.

Career
Arndt was selected in the second round of the 1975 NHL Amateur Draft, 35th overall, by the Chicago Blackhawks, as well as in the second round of the 1975 WHA Amateur Draft, 28th overall, by the New England Whalers. He played parts of three seasons in the WHA, primarily with the Whalers and also played briefly for the Edmonton Oilers and the Birmingham Bulls. He also represented Canada at the 1975 World Junior Ice Hockey Championships, where Canada won the silver medal. 

After retiring in 1978, Arndt

Career statistics

References

External links 

1955 births
Living people
Birmingham Bulls players
Canadian ice hockey left wingers
Cape Codders players
Chicago Blackhawks draft picks
Edmonton Oilers (WHA) players
Hampton Gulls (AHL) players
Ice hockey people from Saskatchewan
New England Whalers draft picks
New England Whalers players
Rhode Island Reds players
Saskatoon Blades players
Springfield Indians players
Sportspeople from Saskatoon